Pyotr Ilyich Tchaikovsky wrote several works well-known to the general classical public: Romeo and Juliet, the 1812 Overture, and the ballets The Nutcracker, Swan Lake and The Sleeping Beauty. These, along with two of his four concertos, three of his symphonies and two of his ten operas, are among his most familiar works. Almost as popular are the Manfred Symphony, Francesca da Rimini, the Capriccio Italien, and the Serenade for Strings.

Works by opus number
Works with opus numbers are listed in this section, together with their dates of composition. For a complete list of Tchaikovsky's works, including those without opus numbers, see here. For more detail on dates of composition, see here.

Op. 1 Two Pieces for piano (1867)
Scherzo à la russe in B major
Impromptu in E minor
Op. 2 Souvenir de Hapsal, 3 pieces for piano (1867)
Op. 3 The Voyevoda, opera (1868)
Op. 4 Valse-caprice in D major, for piano (1868)
Op. 5 Romance in F minor, for piano (1868)
Op. 6 6 Romances (1869), including "None but the lonely heart"
Op. 7 Valse-scherzo in A, for piano (1870)
Op. 8 Capriccio in G, for piano (1870)
Op. 9 3 Morceaux, for piano (1870)
1. Rêverie
2. Polka de salon
3. Mazurka de salon
Op. 10 2 Morceaux, for piano (1871)
1. Nocturne
2. Humoresque
Op. 11 String Quartet No. 1 in D (1871)
Op. 12 Snegurochka (The Snow Maiden), incidental music (1873)
Op. 13 Symphony No. 1 in G minor Winter Daydreams (1866)
Op. 14 Vakula the Smith, (revised as Cherevichki), opera (1874)
Op. 15 Festival Overture in D on the Danish National Anthem, for orchestra (1866)
Op. 16 6 Songs (1872)
No. 1 Lullaby (Cradle Song)
No. 2 Wait!
No. 3 Accept Just Once
No. 4 O, Sing That Song
No. 5 So What?
No. 6 Modern Greek Song
Op. 17 Symphony No. 2 in C minor Little Russian (1872)
Op. 18 The Tempest, symphonic fantasia in F minor, after Shakespeare (1873)
Op. 19 6 Pieces, for piano (1873)
1. Rêverie du soir [Вечерние грезы] (G minor)
2. Scherzo humoristique [Юмористическое скерцо] (D major)
3. Feuillet d'album [Листок из альбома] (D major)
4. Nocturne [Ноктюрн] (C minor)
5. Capriccioso [Каприччиозо] (B major)
6. Thème original et variations [Тема и вариации] (F major)
Op. 20 Swan Lake, ballet (1876)
Op. 21 6 Morceaux on a single theme, for piano (1873)
Op. 22 String Quartet No. 2 in F (1874)
Op. 23 Piano Concerto No. 1 in B minor (1875)
Op. 24 Eugene Onegin, opera (1878)
Op. 25 6 Songs (1874)
No. 1 Reconciliation
No. 2 As When Upon Hot Ashes (Over Burning Ashes)
No. 3 Mignon's Song
No. 4 The Canary
No. 5 I Never Spoke To Her
No. 6 As They Repeated: "Fool"
Op. 26 Sérénade mélancolique in B minor, for violin and orchestra (1875)
Op. 27 6 Songs (1875)
Op. 28 6 Songs (1875)
Op. 29 Symphony No. 3 in D Polish (1875)
Op. 30 String Quartet No. 3 in E minor (1876)
Op. 31 Marche slave in B minor, for orchestra (1876)
Op. 32 Francesca da Rimini, symphonic fantasia in E minor, after Dante Alighieri (1876)
Op. 33 Variations on a Rococo Theme in A, for cello and orchestra (1876)
Op. 34 Valse-scherzo in C for violin and orchestra (1877)
Op. 35 Violin Concerto in D major (1878)
Op. 36 Symphony No. 4 in F minor (1877)
Op. 37 (or 37a) Grand Piano Sonata in G (1878)
Op. 37a (or 37b) The Seasons, 12 pieces for piano (1876)
 January: At the fireside
 February: Carnival
 March: Song of the Lark
 April: Snowdrop
 May: Starlit Nights
 June: Barcarolle
 July: Song of the Reaper
 August: Harvest
 September: The Hunt
 October: Autumn Song
 November: Troika
 December: Christmas
Op. 38 6 Songs (1878)
Op. 39 Album pour enfants, 24 pieces for piano (1878)
 Morning Prayer
 Winter Morning
 Playing Hobby-Horses
 Mama
 March of the Wooden Soldiers
 The New Doll
 The Sick Doll
 The Doll's Funeral
 Waltz
 Polka
 Mazurka
 Russian Song
 The Harmonica Player
 Kamarinskaya
 Peasant Prelude
 Italian song
 Old French Song
 German Song
 Nanny's Story
 The Sorcerer
 Sweet Dreams
 Lark Song
 In Church
 The Song of the Organ-Grinder
Op. 40 12 Morceaux de difficulté moyenne, for piano (1878)
Etude: Allegro giusto (G major)
Chanson triste: Allegro non troppo (G minor)
Marche funèbre: Tempo di Marcia funebre (C minor)
Mazurka: Tempo di Mazurka (C major)
Mazurka: Tempo di Mazurka (D major)
Chant sans paroles: Allegro moderato: (A minor)
Au village: Andante sostenuto: (A minor–C major)
Valse: Tempo di Valse (A♭ major)
Valse: Tempo di Valse (F♯ minor)
Danse russe: Andantino (A minor)
Scherzo: Allegro vivacissimo (D minor)
Rêverie interrompue: Andante un poco rubato e con molto espressione (A♭ major)
Op. 41 Liturgy of St. John Chrysostom, for unaccompanied chorus (1878)
Op. 42 Souvenir d'un lieu cher, 3 pieces for violin and piano (1878)
Op. 43 Orchestral Suite No. 1 in D minor (1879)
Op. 44 Piano Concerto No. 2 in G (1880)
Op. 45 Capriccio Italien in A, for orchestra (1880)
Op. 46 6 Vocal duets, with piano (1880)
Op. 47 7 Songs (1880)
If Only I Had Known
Softly the Spirit Flew up to Heaven
Dusk Fell on the Earth
Sleep, Poor Friend
I Bless You, Forests
Does the Day Reign? 
Was I Not a Little Blade of Grass in the Meadow? 
Op. 48 Serenade in C for Strings (1880)
Op. 49 1812 Overture (1880)
Op. 50 Piano Trio in A minor (1882)
Op. 51 6 Pieces, for piano (1882)
Valse de salon (A major)
Polka peu dansante (B minor)
Menuetto scherzoso (E major)
Natha-Valse (A major)
Romance (F major)
Valse sentimentale (F minor)
Op. 52 All-Night Vigil for unaccompanied chorus (1882)
Op. 53 Orchestral Suite No. 2 in C (1883)
Op. 54 16 Children's songs (1883; the 5th song Legend was the basis of Anton Arensky's Variations on a Theme by Tchaikovsky, Op. 35a)
Op. 55 Orchestral Suite No. 3 in G (1884)
Op. 56 Concert Fantasia in G, for piano and orchestra (1884)
Op. 57 6 Songs (1884)
Op. 58 Manfred Symphony in B minor (1885)
Op. 59 Dumka in C minor, for piano (1886)
Op. 60 12 Songs (1886)
No. 6 Wild Nights (Frenzied Nights)
No. 7 Gypsy's Song
No. 12 Gentle Stars Shone For Us (The Mild Stars Shone For Us)
Op. 61 Orchestral Suite No. 4 "Mozartiana" (1887)
Op. 62 Pezzo capriccioso in B minor, for cello and orchestra (or piano) (1887)
Op. 63 6 Romances on words by K. Romanov (1887)
No. 1 I Didn't Love You At First [Я сначала тебя не любила]
No. 2 I Opened The Window [Растворил я окно]
No. 3 I Do Not Please You [Я вам не нравлюсь]
No. 4 The First Meeting [Первое свидание]
No. 5 The Fires In The Rooms Were Already Out [Уж гасли в комнатах огни]
No. 6 Serenade: O Child! Beneath Your Window [Серенада (О, дитя! под окошком твоим)]
Op. 64 Symphony No. 5 in E minor (1888)
Op. 65 6 Songs on French texts (1888) (No. 2 Déception, No. 3 Sérénade ("J'aime dans le rayon"), No. 4 Qu'importe que l'hiver, No. 6 Rondel, all on poems by Paul Collin)
Op. 66 The Sleeping Beauty, ballet (1889)
Op. 67a Hamlet, fantasy overture in F minor (1889)
Op. 67b Hamlet, incidental music (1891)
Op. 68 The Queen of Spades, opera (1890)
Op. 69 Iolanta, opera (1891)
Op. 70 String Sextet in D minor Souvenir de Florence (1890)
Op. 71 The Nutcracker, ballet (1892)
Op. 71a The Nutcracker, suite from the ballet (1892)
Op. 72 18 Pieces, for piano (1893)
Op. 73 Romances (6 Songs) (1893)
Op. 74 Symphony No. 6 in B minor Pathétique (1893)

Opp. 75–80 were published posthumously.
Op. 75 Piano Concerto No. 3 in E (1893)
Op. 76 The Storm, overture in E minor (1864)
Op. 77 Fatum, symphonic poem in C minor (1868)
Op. 78 The Voyevoda, symphonic ballad in A minor (1893; unrelated to the earlier opera of the same name, Op. 3)
Op. 79 Andante and Finale, for piano and orchestra (1893; this was Sergei Taneyev's idea of what Tchaikovsky might have written had he used three of the movements of the abandoned Symphony in E, rather than just the first movement Allegro brillante, when rescoring the symphony as the Piano Concerto No. 3 in E)
Op. 80 Piano Sonata No. 2 in C minor (1865)

Works by genre

Ballets
 Swan Lake, Op. 20 (1875–76)
 The Sleeping Beauty, Op. 66 (1889)
 The Nutcracker, Op. 71 (1892)

Operas
 The Voyevoda (Воевода – The Voivode, Op. 3, 1867–1868)
 Undina (Ундина or Undine, 1869, not completed)
 The Oprichnik (Опричник), 1870–1872
 Vakula the Smith (Кузнец Вакула or Kuznets Vakula), Op. 14, 1874
 Eugene Onegin (Евгений Онегин or Yevgeny Onegin), Op. 24, 1877–1878
 The Maid of Orleans (Орлеанская дева or Orleanskaya deva), 1878–1879
 Mazepa (or Mazeppa) (Мазепа), 1881–1883
 Cherevichki (Черевички; revision of Vakula the Smith) 1885
 The Enchantress (or The Sorceress, Чародейка or Charodeyka), 1885–1887
 The Queen of Spades (Пиковая дама or Pikovaya dama), Op. 68, 1890
 Iolanta (Иоланта), Op. 69, 1891

Symphonies
 No. 1 in G minor, Op. 13, Winter Daydreams (1866)
 No. 2 in C minor, Op. 17, Little Russian (1872)
 No. 3 in D major, Op. 29, Polish (1875)
 No. 4 in F minor, Op. 36 (1877–1878)
 Manfred Symphony, B minor, Op. 58; inspired by Byron's poem Manfred (1885)
 No. 5 in E minor, Op. 64 (1888)
 Symphony in E (sketched 1892 but abandoned; Tchaikovsky rescored its first movement as the Piano Concerto No. 3 in E; posthumously, Taneyev rescored two other movements for piano and orchestra as the Andante and Finale; the symphony was reconstructed during the 1950s and subsequently published as "Symphony No. 7")
 No. 6 in B minor, Op. 74, Pathétique (1893)

Concertos and concertante pieces 
 Piano Concerto No. 1 in B minor, Op. 23 (1874–75)
 Sérénade mélancolique, Op. 26, for violin and orchestra (1875)
 Variations on a Rococo Theme for cello and orchestra, Op. 33 (1876–77)
 Valse-Scherzo for violin and orchestra, Op. 34
 Violin Concerto in D major, Op. 35 (1878)
 Piano Concerto No. 2 in G major, Op. 44 (1879–80)
 Concert Fantasia in G for piano and orchestra, Op. 56 (1884)
 Pezzo capriccioso, Op. 62, for cello and Orchestra (1888)
 Piano Concerto No. 3 in E major, Op. posth. 75 (1893)
 Andante and Finale for piano and orchestra, Op. posth. 79 (1893)
 This was Sergei Taneyev's idea of what Tchaikovsky might have written had he used three of the movements of the abandoned Symphony in E, rather than just the first movement Allegro brillante, when rescoring the symphony as the Piano Concerto No. 3 in E
 Cello Concerto (conjectural work based in part on a 60-bar fragment found on the back of the rough draft for the last movement of the composer's Sixth Symphony).
 Concertstück for Flute and Strings, TH 247 Op. posth. (1893)

Other orchestral works
 Ode an die Freude (Schiller), für SATB Solo, SATB und großes Orchester (1865)

Program music and commissioned pieces
 The Storm, Op. posth. 76 (1864)
 Festival Overture on the Danish National Anthem, Op. 15 (1866)
 Fatum, Op. posth. 77 (1868)
 Romeo and Juliet (1870, revised 1880)
 The Tempest, Op. 18 (1873)
 Marche Slave, Op. 31 (1876)
 Francesca da Rimini, Op. 32 (1876)
 Capriccio Italien, Op. 45 (1880)
 1812 Overture, Op. 49 (1882)
 Festival Coronation March (1883)
 Hamlet, Op. 67a (1889)
 The Voyevoda, Op. posth. 78 (1891)

Orchestral suites and Serenade
 Orchestral Suite No. 1 in D minor, Op. 43 (1878–1879)
 Orchestral Suite No. 2 in C major, Op. 53 (1883)
 Orchestral Suite No. 3 in G major, Op. 55 (1884)
 Orchestral Suite No. 4 in G major "Mozartiana", Op. 61 (1887)
 Serenade for Strings in C major, Op. 48 (1880)

Incidental music
 Dmitri the Pretender and Vassily Shuisky (1867), incidental music to Alexander Ostrovsky's play Dmitri the Pretender
 The Snow Maiden (Snegurochka), Op. 12 (1873), incidental music for Ostrovsky's play of the same name. Ostrovsky adapted and dramatized a popular Russian fairy tale, and the score that Tchaikovsky wrote for it was always one of his own favorite works. It contains much vocal music, but it is not a cantata or an opera.
 Montenegrins Receiving News of Russia's Declaration of War on Turkey (1880), music for a tableau.
 The Voyevoda (1886), incidental music for the Domovoy scene from Ostrovsky's A Dream on the Volga
 Hamlet, Op. 67b (1891), incidental music for Shakespeare's play. The score uses music borrowed from Tchaikovsky's overture of the same name, as well as from his Symphony No. 3, and from The Snow Maiden, in addition to original music that he wrote specifically for a stage production of Hamlet. The two vocal selections are a song that Ophelia sings in the throes of her madness and a song for the First Gravedigger to sing as he goes about his work.

Piano 

Two Pieces, Op. 1 (1867)
Scherzo à la russe
Impromptu
Souvenir de Hapsal, Op. 2, 3 pieces (1867)
Valse-caprice in D major, Op. 4 (1868)
Romance in F minor, Op. 5 (1868)
Valse-scherzo in A, Op. 7 (1870)
Capriccio in G, Op. 8 (1870)
3 Morceaux, Op. 9 (1870)
1. Rêverie
2. Polka de salon
3. Mazurka de salon
2 Morceaux, Op. 10 (1871)
1. Nocturne
2. Humoresque
6 Pieces, Op. 19 (1873)
1. Rêverie du soir [Вечерние грезы] (G minor)
2. Scherzo humoristique [Юмористическое скерцо] (D major)
3. Feuillet d'album [Листок из альбом] (D major)
4. Nocturne [Ноктюрн] (C minor)
5. Capriccioso [Каприччиозо] (B major)
6. Thème original et variations [Тема и вариации] (F major)
6 Morceaux, Op. 21 (1873)
 The Seasons (Les saisons), Op. 37a (1876), 12 pieces
 Piano Sonata in G major, Op. 37 (1878)
Album pour enfants, Op. 39, 24 pieces for piano (1878)
12 Morceaux de difficulté moyenne, Op. 40 (1878)
 Six Morceaux, Op. 51 (1882)
 Dumka, Russian rustic scene in C minor for piano, Op. 59 (1886)
 18 Morceaux for piano, Op. 72 (1892). Some of these pieces were used in a cello concerto arrangement by Gaspar Cassadó.
 Piano Sonata No. 2 in C minor, Op. posth. 80 (1865)

Chamber music 
 Adagio molto in E major for string quartet and harp (1863/64)
 String Quartet in B major, Op. posth. (1865)
 String Quartet No. 1 in D major, Op. 11 (1871)
 String Quartet No. 2 in F major, Op. 22 (1874)
 String Quartet No. 3 in E minor, Op. 30 (1876)
 Souvenir d'un lieu cher (Memory of a Cherished Place) for violin and piano, Op. 42 (Meditation, Scherzo and Melody) (1878)
 Piano Trio in A minor, Op. 50 (1882)
 String Sextet in D minor (Souvenir de Florence), Op. 70 (1890)

Choral music 
A considerable quantity of choral music (about 25 items), including:
 Cantata (Hymn) on the Occasion of the Celebration of the 50th Jubilee of the Singer Osip Afanasievich Petrov, tenor, chorus and orchestra, words by Nikolay Nekrasov (1875; performed at the St Petersburg Conservatory on 6 May 1876, under the conductor Karl Davydov)
 A Hymn to the Trinity (1877)
 Liturgy of St John Chrysostom, Op. 41 (1878)
 All-Night Vigil, Op. 52 (1881)
 Moscow (1883)
 9 Sacred Pieces (alternative name: 9 Church Pieces) (1884–85)
 Legend (choral arrangement of song Op. 54 No. 5, written 1889, published 1890)

Arrangements of the works of others

See also
 Pyotr Ilyich Tchaikovsky in popular media

References

Notes

Bibliography 
 ed Abraham, Gerald, Music of Tchaikovsky (New York: W.W. Norton & Company, 1946). ISBN n/a.
 Abraham, Gerald, "Operas and Incidental Music"
 Alshvang, A., tr. I. Freiman, "The Songs"
 Cooper, Martin, "The Symphonies"
 Dickinson, A.E.F., "The Piano Music"
 Evans, Edwin, "The Ballets"
 Mason, Colin, "The Chamber Music"
 Wood, Ralph W., "Miscellaneous Orchestral Works"
 Brown, David, ed. Stanley Sadie, "Tchaikokvsky, Pyotr Ilyich," The New Grove Encyclopedia of Music and Musicians (London: Macmillan, 1980), 20 vols. .
 Brown, David, Tchaikovsky: The Early Years, 1840-1874 (New York: W.W. Norton & Company, 1978). .
 Brown, David, Tchaikovsky: The Crisis Years, 1874-1878, (New York: W.W. Norton & Company, 1983). .
 Brown, David, Tchaikovsky: The Years of Wandering, 1878-1885, (New York: W.W. Norton & Company, 1986). .
 Brown, David, Tchaikovsky: The Final Years, 1885-1893, (New York: W.W. Norton & Company, 1991). .
 Brown, David, Tchaikovsky: The Man and His Music (New York: Pegasus Books, 2007). .
 Maes, Francis, tr. Arnold J. Pomerans and Erica Pomerans, A History of Russian Music: From Kamarinskaya to Babi Yar (Berkeley, Los Angeles and London: University of California Press, 2002). .
 Schonberg, Harold C., Lives of the Great Composers (New York: W.W. Norton & Company, 3rd ed. 1997).
 Steinberg, Michael, The Symphony (New York and Oxford: Oxford University Press, 1995).
 Warrack, John, Tchaikovsky Symphonies and Concertos (Seattle: University of Washington Press, 1969). Library of Congress Catalog Card No. 78-105437.
 Warrack, John, Tchaikovsky (New York: Charles Scribner's Sons, 1973). SBN 684-13558-2.
 Wiley, Roland John, Tchaikovsky's Ballets (Oxford and New York: Oxford University Press, 1985). .

 
Tchaikovsky, Pyotr Ilyich